"A Man This Lonely" is a song written by Ronnie Dunn and Tommy Lee James, and recorded by American country music duo Brooks & Dunn. Dunn and James, who played guitar in Brooks & Dunn's backing band at the time, wrote the song while on tour in Canada. It was released in December 1996 as the fourth single from Brooks & Dunn's album Borderline.  It reached number 1 on Billboard magazine's Hot Country Songs chart.

Critical reception
Billboard reviewed the single favorably, saying that "the song boasts a solid lyric, and as usual Dunn wrings every drop of emotion out of each line".

Music video
The video was directed by Michael Oblowitz. The video takes place at the CF Ranch in Alpine, Texas.

Chart positions
"A Man This Lonely" debuted at number 51 on the U.S. Billboard Hot Country Songs chart for the week of December 7, 1996.

Year-end charts

References

1996 singles
Brooks & Dunn songs
Songs written by Tommy Lee James
Songs written by Ronnie Dunn
Song recordings produced by Don Cook
Arista Nashville singles
1996 songs